Atle Rotevatn (born 1976 in Norway) is a professor of geology at the University of Bergen in Norway. In 2011, he received the Reusch Medal from the Norwegian Geological Society. And in 2018, he received the Olav Thon national award for excellence in teaching.

References

External links
Norwegian Geological Society

Living people
Norwegian petroleum geologists
21st-century Norwegian geologists
Academic staff of the University of Bergen
1976 births